Jung Jae-hyung & Lee Hyo-ri's You and I is a South Korean late night music program which began airing on February 26, 2012, on Sunday nights at 12:00AM on SBS. It is the follow-up program to Kim Jung-eun's Chocolate, which was cancelled a year earlier. The program is hosted by good friends and singers, Jung Jae-hyung and Lee Hyo-ri. The program aired its final episode on October 14, 2012, ending its ten-month run due to low ratings.

List of episodes

Similar Programs 
SBS Kim Jung-eun's Chocolate
KBS Yu Hee-yeol's Sketchbook
MBC Beautiful Concert (아름다운 콘서트)

Notes

References

External links 
 Jung Jae-hyung & Lee Hyo-ri's You and I Official Homepage 

Seoul Broadcasting System original programming
South Korean music television shows
2012 South Korean television series debuts
Korean-language television shows
2012 South Korean television series endings